DWNP (106.5 FM), broadcasting as 106.5 UMFM, is a radio station owned and operated by Multipoint Broadcasting Network. The station's studio and transmitter are located in Palayan.

References

External links
UMFM FB Page

Radio stations in Nueva Ecija
Radio stations established in 2017